The 36th Vanier Cup was played on December 2, 2000, at the SkyDome in Toronto, Ontario, and decided the CIAU football champion for the 2000 season. The Ottawa Gee-Gees won their second championship in school history by defeating the Regina Rams by a score of 42-39.

Game summary
Ottawa Gee-Gees (42) - TDs, Côté (2), Shaver, Ajram, DiBattista (2); cons., Lee-Yaw (6).

Regina Rams (39) - TDs, Leason (2), Clermont, Hughes, Warnecke; FGs Ryan; cons., Ryan (3), Olynick.

Scoring summary
First Quarter
OTT - TD Côté 4 run (Lee-Yaw convert) (7:18)
OTT - TD Côté 3 run (Lee-Yaw convert) (10:44)

Second Quarter
REG - TD Leason 1 run (Ryan convert) (1:29)
OTT - TD Shaver 27 pass from Côté (Lee-Yaw convert) (3:50)
REG - FG Ryan 25 (7:46)
OTT - TD Arjam 15 run (Lee-Yaw convert) (9:57)
OTT - TD DiBattista 9 pass from Côté (Lee-Yaw convert) (14:57)

Third Quarter
REG - TD Leason 1 run (Ryan convert) (7:14)

Fourth Quarter
REG - TD Clermont 16 pass from Leason (Ryan convert) (0:30)
OTT - TD DiBattista 27 pass from Côté (Lee-Yaw convert) (4:21)
REG - TD Hughes 3 run (Ryan convert) (8:02)
REG - TD Warnecke 25 pass from Leason (two-point convert Olynick 5 pass from Leason) (15:00)

References

External links
 Official website

Vanier Cup
Vanier Cup
2000 in Toronto
December 2000 sports events in Canada
Canadian football competitions in Toronto